Peter Clifton (1941 – 31 May 2018), was an Australian film director. His most commercially successful work was the Led Zeppelin concert film The Song Remains the Same (1976).

Clifton was born in Sydney and had experience in music film production prior to his involvement with Led Zeppelin, having made a 30-minute cinema short about Australian band The Easybeats' tour of England in 1967, called Somewhere Between Heaven And Woolworths, and also having filmed Jimi Hendrix live in concert. In 1973 he also directed two films of music footage: Sound of the City: London 1964–73 (also known as Rock City), which featured both concert footage and interviews, and The London Rock and Roll Show, which documented a major rock and roll festival held at Wembley Stadium, London, in August 1972. In 1974 he was planning to shoot a reggae film in Jamaica when he was approached by Led Zeppelin's manager, Peter Grant, to complete their concert film. The film had originally been begun by director Joe Massot, but Massot was fired by the band prior to its completion.

After completing post-production on the film Clifton had a falling out with Led Zeppelin. Suspecting that Clifton had 'stolen' negatives of the film, Grant ordered that his house be searched while Peter and his family were away on holidays. They did find some footage, but this turned out to be a collection of the best 'home movie' footage which Clifton had intended to give to the band members as a gift. Clifton was also annoyed at the decision to remove from the film's credits the names of all the people who had worked on editing, make up and effects.

In 1979 Clifton directed the concert film Live in Central Park, featuring the final concert of America's world tour – the only time that the band has been officially captured on film. Clifton also made the famous film clip of the Rolling Stones' performance of "Jumpin' Jack Flash". He has produced many other Rolling Stones clips and videos, along with videos for The Beach Boys, Jim Morrison and Eric Clapton.
Clifton also filmed in 1979 a live concert from Supertramp called 'Paris' on 16mm, the film was found in 2006 and restored with the help of Clifton.

Clifton returned to Australia in the mid-1980s after many years living overseas to start the Hard Rock Cafe there. It opened in Sydney on 1 April 1989. In 1984 produced and directed the rockumentary AUSTRALIA NOW ! starring INXS, Men at Work, Midnight Oil and Split Enz.

In 2003 Clifton co-wrote with Michael Thomas and produced his first feature film, The Night We Called It a Day, the story of Frank Sinatra's tour of Australia in 1974.

In 2006 it was reported that a 16 mm reel of the Apollo 11 moon landing belonging to Clifton, which had been held for 20 years in a Sydney vault as part of his personal film catalogue, was rediscovered. Clifton had ordered the reel in 1979 for a rock film he was making about Pink Floyd's The Dark Side of the Moon, ordering the film for $US180 from the Smithsonian Institution in Washington, DC but forgot he had it until seeing a news report on television.

The footage of Neil Armstrong's "one small step" is considered among the most important artefacts of the 20th century but the original NASA tapes have been mislaid somewhere in the US. It is hoped documentation associated with Clifton's reel will help direct researchers to the warehouse or museum where the missing tapes are stored – if they still exist.

In 2009, Clifton co-produced The Bloody Ashes, a film which focuses on the 1932–33 Ashes Bodyline series. He also began developing the Peter FitzSimons book Tobruk into a feature film.

Clifton died in May 2018.

References

External links

News report on Clifton's rediscovered moon landing film
Peter Clifton Obituary 2018

1945 births
2018 deaths
Australian film directors
Australian film producers
People from New South Wales